Pedro Luiz Barone (born June 29, 1986 in Viana, Espírito Santo), commonly known as Pedrão, is a Brazilian footballer who plays for Gama as defender. He also played for Ipatinga in Campeonato Brasileiro Série B.

Career statistics

References

External links

1986 births
Living people
Brazilian footballers
Association football defenders
Ipatinga Futebol Clube players
Sociedade Esportiva do Gama players